The 1992–93 Slovenian Third League was the first season of the Slovenian Third League, the third highest level in the Slovenian football system.

League standings

East

West

See also
1992–93 Slovenian Second League

References

External links
Football Association of Slovenia 

Slovenian Third League seasons
3